German submarine U-664 was a Type VIIC U-boat built for Nazi Germany's Kriegsmarine for service during World War II.
She was laid down on 11 July 1941 by Howaldtswerke, Hamburg as yard number 813, launched on 28 April 1942 and commissioned on 17 June 1942 under Oberleutnant zur See Adolf Graef.

Design
German Type VIIC submarines were preceded by the shorter Type VIIB submarines. U-664 had a displacement of  when at the surface and  while submerged. She had two shafts and two  propellers.

U-664 was fitted with five  torpedo tubes (four fitted at the bow and one at the stern), fourteen torpedoes, one  SK C/35 naval gun, 220 rounds, and a  C/30 anti-aircraft gun. The boat had a complement of between forty-four and sixty.

Service history
The boat's career began with training at 8th U-boat Flotilla on 17 June 1942, followed by active service on 1 November 1942 as part of the 9th Flotilla for the remainder of her service.

First Patrol
On her first day of active service she was attacked by a US Catalina. The depth charge attack was so effective that she had to return to base in France.

Convoy ONS 167
Outward bound from Biscay on her second patrol, U-664 made a chance sighting of the slow convoy and radioed its position to base. Karl Dönitz ordered Graef to shadow the convoy while other boats were rounded up to form Wolfpack Sturmbock. However the boats were well scattered and failed to make contact with the convoy, so on the night of 21 February 1943, Graef became impatient with waiting and decided to attack alone.

With one spread of torpedoes, Graef sank the  American steamer Rosario and the  Panamanian tanker H H Rogers.

Wolfpacks
U-664 took part in eight wolfpacks, namely:
 Raufbold (11 – 22 December 1942)
 Spitz (22 – 31 December 1942)
 Sturmbock (21 – 26 February 1943)
 Wildfang (26 February – 5 March 1943)
 Raubgraf (7 – 20 March 1943)
 Without name (5 – 10 May 1943)
 Lech (10 – 15 May 1943)
 Donau 2 (15 – 26 May 1943)

Fate
On 8 August 1943 U-664 fired three torpedoes at the escort carrier  in a surprise attack, before USS Card was able to respond and forced her to dive. The following day, on 9 August 1943, U-664 was sunk in the North Atlantic in position , by depth charges from USN Grumman Avenger aircraft launched from the carrier. Seven crew members were killed  and 44 rescued by USS Borie after seven hours in the water.

Summary of raiding history

References

Bibliography

External links

German Type VIIC submarines
1942 ships
U-boats commissioned in 1942
Ships lost with all hands
U-boats sunk in 1943
U-boats sunk by depth charges
U-boats sunk by US aircraft
World War II shipwrecks in the Atlantic Ocean
World War II submarines of Germany
Ships built in Hamburg
Maritime incidents in August 1943